William Patrick Fitzgerald (26 July 1864 – 26 February 1938) was an Australian politician who served as Lord Mayor of Sydney in 1920. Actively involved in Labor Party politics, Fitzgerald was an alderman for the City of Sydney from 1904 to 1927.

Fitzgerald was born in Sydney, New South Wales, the son of William and Ellen Fitzgerald. Outside of politics, he was a grocer and merchant. He married Matilda Louise Byrne in 1899. The couple had three children. He died on 26 February 1938 at his residence in Randwick, Sydney, aged 73.

References

1864 births
1938 deaths
20th-century Australian politicians
Australian Labor Party councillors
Mayors and Lord Mayors of Sydney
Politicians from Sydney